Edward "Ed" Hutchins is known as "one of the most inventive book artists" and proprietor of Editions, a small press publisher of artists' book multiples, since 1989.

Biography
In the 1980s, Hutchins started taking classes at The Center for Book Arts in New York City. In 1996, he enrolled in the Fine Arts graduate program at Purchase College to study book arts. Paper engineers and artists who have influenced him include Vojtěch Kubašta, Ruth Tilden (author, What's in the Fridge?: A Tasty Pop-up ABC), and Julian Wehr.

Hutchins's subscribes to a "guerrilla bookmaking" philosophy where "everyone is a maker of books because everyone has a story to tell". Books are made with materials at hand and simple skills available to anyone interested.

The books Hutchins creates often involve innovative styles such as books made using a single sheet of paper folded multiple times, tunnel books that allow the reader to "see through" the book, and flexagons, where pages fold into themselves to create new pages. Anne Anninger, Houghton Library, Philip Hofer Curator of Printing & Graphic Arts, collected Hutchins' books for Harvard's library and has said "...Hutchins' little books made the point: begin with a deep concern for human issues and a strong sense of empathy, and express them in a few simple words; add funky imagery; present the whole in a unique, humorous, and expressive structure, which requires years of experience yet the irreverence of youth... Impossible, you say? Not for Ed Hutchins."

In 1989, Hutchins started Editions, a press for publishing limited editions of art books.

In 1998, he founded Book Central, a catalog of the most useful how-to books for bookbinding, structures, papermaking, printing, pop-ups, paper engineering and creating books with children. The catalog business was later sold in 2000.

Books
Books by Hutchins include:
 Album, 1997, an autobiographical tetra-tetra-flexagon (four edges, four faces book).
 Do Sit Down, 1992, book's text can be pulled from seat cushion of an actual miniature chair.
 Explosive Politics: Contrasting Views of Civic Discourse, 2016, a book within a firecracker case. 
 Gay Myths, 1993 and 2002, sewn pamphlet with multiple foldouts and social commentary. Inspired by the 1993 March on Washington for Gay Rights.
 Grandma's Closet, 1991, tunnel book.
 Mystery of the Magic Box, 1995, a single sheet of paper is cut and folded into 56 pages and box cover.
 Twisted, 1992, twisting the book covers automatically advance or unfold the book pages.
 Voces de México, 2000, rotating flexagon with Mexican sayings and quotations.

Awards
  Honorable Mention, "Exhibition Catalogues" category, American Association of Museums, 1996 for The Mystery of the Magic Box.

Exhibitions

Book contributions
 The Art of the Pop-up, by Jean-Charles Trebbi,2014. Pattern of a spiral petal book by Hutchins is on pages 156–157.
 Making Handmade Books: 100+ Bindings, Structures and Forms by Alisa Golden, 2010. Hutchins' Album and Voces de México and pictured. Instructions for making tetra-tetra-flexagon and cross-flexgons are included on pages 130, 132–133.
 Paper Engineering: 3-D Design Techniques for a 2-D Material by Natalie Avella, 2009. Profile on Ed Hutchins on pages 148-153, including photos of six artists' books.
 Playing with Pop-ups: The Art of Dimensional, Moving Paper Designs by Helen Hiebert, 2014. Ed Hutchins' books are featured on page 106.

References

External links

Living people
1948 births
American art curators
Pop-up book artists
American gay artists
University of Arizona alumni